The first series of Geordie Shore, a British television programme based in Newcastle upon Tyne, began airing on 24 May 2011 on MTV. The series concluded on 12 July 2011 after 6 episodes and 2 specials including a reunion show hosted by Russell Kane and an episode counting down the best bits of the series. From 23 August 2011 until 30 August 2011, 2 Magaluf specials aired on MTV, however these episodes are featured on the series 2 DVD. The series included the turbulent relationship of Holly (who entered in the house three days late) with Dan coming to an end, the beginning of Gaz and Charlotte's ongoing love/hate relationship, and Jay and Vicky's rocky relationship. This was the only series to feature Greg Lake.

Cast
 Charlotte Crosby
Gaz Beadle
 Vicky Pattison
 Holly Hagan
 James Tindale
 Jay Gardner
 Sophie Kasaei
 Greg Lake

Duration of cast 

 = Cast member is featured in this episode.
 = Cast member arrives in the house.
 = Cast member voluntarily leaves the house.
 = Cast member returns to the house.
 = Cast member leaves the series.
 = Cast member does not feature in this episode.

Episodes

Main series

Magaluf Specials

Ratings

References

2011 British television seasons
Series 01